Enthusiasm indicates a human emotion of deep enjoyment.

Enthusiasm may also refer to:
Enthusiasm (film), a 1931 Soviet film by Dziga Vertov
"Enthusiasm", a song by the American band Bright from their self-titled album

See also
Enthusiast (disambiguation)